Vedran Vrhovac (born 20 November 1998) is a Bosnian professional footballer who plays as a centre-back for Slovenian PrvaLiga side Radomlje.

References

External links
Vedran Vrhovac at Sofascore

1998 births
Living people
People from Busovača
Croats of Bosnia and Herzegovina
Bosnia and Herzegovina footballers
Bosnia and Herzegovina under-21 international footballers
Association football central defenders
NK Vitez players
NK Novigrad players
NK Čelik Zenica players
FK Željezničar Sarajevo players
FC Petrolul Ploiești players
NK Radomlje players
Premier League of Bosnia and Herzegovina players
First Football League (Croatia) players
Liga II players
Slovenian PrvaLiga players
Bosnia and Herzegovina expatriate footballers
Expatriate footballers in Croatia
Bosnia and Herzegovina expatriate sportspeople in Croatia
Expatriate footballers in Romania
Bosnia and Herzegovina expatriate sportspeople in Romania
Expatriate footballers in Slovenia
Bosnia and Herzegovina expatriate sportspeople in Slovenia